Sun Caiyun (born July 21, 1973 in Shenzhen) is a Chinese former pole vaulter, who was one of the leading athletes in her discipline in the early 1990s. She became the first official world record holder, jumping 4.05 meters on May 21, 1992 in Nanjing, China. In 1994 she received a three-month doping ban.

Competition record

References
 All-Time List

1973 births
Living people
Chinese female pole vaulters
World record setters in athletics (track and field)
Hakka people
Hakka sportspeople
Place of birth missing (living people)
Asian Games medalists in athletics (track and field)
Athletes (track and field) at the 1998 Asian Games
Athletes from Guangdong
Sportspeople from Shenzhen
Doping cases in athletics
Goodwill Games medalists in athletics
Asian Games bronze medalists for China
Medalists at the 1998 Asian Games
Competitors at the 1994 Goodwill Games